No. 358 Squadron RAF was a Bomber and Special duties squadron of the Royal Air Force flying with South East Asia Command from 1944 to 1945.

History
The squadron was formed on 8 November 1944 at Kolar, India with personnel of the disbanded 1673 Heavy Conversion Unit. Its role was as a heavy bomber unit flying the Consolidated Liberator. The squadron performed only one bombing mission on 13 January 1945, bombing Mandalay and by then flying from Digri. Thereafter the squadron role changed to a special duties squadron, starting operations as such in the night from 22 to 23 January 1945, when 11 of the squadron's Liberators were dispatched on missions around Hanoi. Three aircraft were lost, with only two successfully completing their missions. On 10 February 1945 the squadron moved to Jessore. For the rest of the war the squadron dropped agents and supplies to resistance groups in Japanese-held territory. After the Japanese surrender the squadron then dropped supplies to POW camps and repatriated released prisoners. It was disbanded on 21 November 1945 at Bishnupur.

Aircraft operated

Squadron bases

See also
List of Royal Air Force aircraft squadrons

References

Citations

Bibliography

External links
 No. 358 squadron history

Aircraft squadrons of the Royal Air Force in World War II
358 Squadron
Military units and formations established in 1944
Military units and formations disestablished in 1945